Justin Kelly (born March 7, 1992) is a Canadian actor, best known for his roles as Noah Jackson on the Family channel original series The Latest Buzz and as Jake Martin in Degrassi. Since 2019, Kelly has played the role of Jesse Mills on Hudson & Rex.

Career 
In 2014, Kelly appeared in David Cronenberg's Maps to the Stars. He appeared as Wes in Open Heart, Robin in Wynnona Earp, Chuck in Between .

In 2019, Kelly began appearing on the Canadian hit series Hudson & Rex as Jesse Mills, an IT specialist for the St. John's Police Department. Kelly has played Jesse for four seasons as of Spring 2022. Of his feelings about playing Jesse, Kelly said, "I get to really play with these quirks and explore the nerdy comedic side of him, because he’s the youngest one on the team. He’s the millennial. He makes the jokes that the older folks don’t quite understand. That’s something that I just always latched onto and always really enjoyed." Following the finale of season 4, the hit show has since been renewed for season 5, set to premier in Fall 2022.

Personal life 
Justin Kelly has been engaged to Kathryn Fantaske since December 2018. They got married in December 2021. He attended Earl Haig Secondary School.

Filmography

Film

Television

References

External links

Canadian male child actors
Living people
1992 births
Male actors from Toronto
21st-century Canadian male actors
Canadian male film actors
Canadian male television actors
Canadian male voice actors